The Nagvanshis of Chotanagpur, also known as the Khokhra chieftaincy, was an Indian dynasty which ruled the parts of Chota Nagpur plateau region (modern-day Jharkhand) during much of ancient, medieval and modern period. Phani Mukut Rai is considered the first king of dynasty claim to be son of Pundrika Naga, a mythical Naga. Lal Chintamani Sharan Nath Shahdeo (1931–2014) was last ruling king of the dynasty, until the estate was merged to the Republic of India.

Origin
The origins of the Nagvanshis are unknown. The Nagvanshi claim descent from Nagas. According to Nagvanshavali (genealogy of Nagvanshi), the Nagvanshi dynasty originated with Pundarika Naga, the son of Takshaka. The son of Pundarika Naga, Phani Mukut Rai, founded the Nagvanshi dynasty. Phani Mukut Rai was born on return journey from Puri to Varanasi. The Pundarika Naga turned Cobra after revealing his identity and his wife Parvati committed Sati. Later the Sakaldwipiya Brahmin found the child and took the child to Madura Munda, the chief of Sutiambe village. Madura Munda and other Raja such as King of Surguja and Aditya king of Patkum  elected Phani Mukut Rai as king due to his qualities. His empire was named Nagpur. However, the story of Phani Mukut Rai is mostly considered to be a myth and an invented story of Brahminacal origin of the dynasty. 

Many scholars put the date of establishment of Nagvanshi dynasty in the 4th century taking into account an average ruling period of 25 years for each king. According to a different source, the dynasty was founded in the 5th century as a successor state to the Gupta Empire. According to many historians the Nagvanshi dynasty was possibly established in 10th century.

Lineage
The lineage of Nagvanshi is Kashyap gotra. According to Bhagavata Purana, Sage Kashyapa and his wives generated various beings, including the Naga. Hence, Mlecchas, i.e followers of non-vedic tradition were being bestowed by Kashyap gotra. Kashyap gotra is also used for vedic ritual performances for those who have forgotten their gotra. In this process, several people adopted Kashyap gotra during the 1st millennium.

History

Ancient period
According to Nagvanshi annals, Phani Mukut Rai was founder of Nagvanshi dynasty who was the son of Sakaldwipiya Brahmin, a Parvati girl from Varanasi, and Pundarika Naga, the descendant of Naga king Takshaka. He was elevated to the throne by Madra Munda and other kings such as the king of Suguja and Aditya king of Patkum in Sutiambe which is located around 20 km north of Ranchi. His rule extended to Ramgarh, Gola, Tori, and Gharwe. He built a sun temple in Pithoria and established Brahmin from Puri by donating villages. But the remains of sun idols in Pithoria are dated to the 12th century. The story of Phani Mukut Rai is mostly considered to be a myth by scholars. According to  Nagvanshavali, the third Nagvanshi king Pratap Rai shifted his capital from Sutiambe to the present day chutia.

Medieval period
A Sanskrit inscription of a Mahamaya temple in Gumla district mention the establishment of temple by King Gajghat Rai in Vikram Samvat in 965 (908 CE) and his rajguru Rastrakuta Brahmin Shianath Dev. The Brahmanda Purana (c. 400 – c. 1000) mentions Nagvanshis as Naga king. It gives descriptions of five dwips, i.e. lands. It includes the Sankha dwip where Sankh river flows from the hill near the kingdom of the Naga King, where precious stones are found.

In 12th century, Raja Bhim Karn defeated Raksel of Surguja when they invaded the region. Then he conquered territory as far as Surguja and Palamu. He shifted his capital from present day Chutia to Khukhragarh. There are ancient fort, temple, coin and pottery remains found in the region. Shivdas Karn established Vishnu idol in the Hapamuni temple in Gumla district in Vikram Samvat 1458 (1401 CE) according to an inscription in Sanskrit. According to Nag vanshavali, during the reign of Pratap Karn, king of Sandhya, Tamar, Ghatwar kings rebelled. The king of Tamar indulged in plunder and loot. He seized fort of Nagvanshi king in Khukhragarh. Pratap Karn sought help of chief Baghdeo of Khayaragarh. Baghdeo was made Fauzdar of Karra Pargana and he suppressed the rebellion in Tamar. The son of king of Tamar made king of Karnpura but he did not pay tax for three years. Baghdeo was sent to Karnpura to extract tax. Baghdeo defeated the king of Kapardeo and killed him. He also destroyed their fort Mahudigarh. Then he declared himself king of Karnpura. For this help Pratap Karn declared Baghdeo as King of Karnpura which gives rise to Ramgarh Raj.

Modern period
During the 16th century, king Madhu Karn ruled the region. Mirza Nathan refers to the region as Khokhradesh. In 1585, the Mughal Empire invaded during the reign of Raja Madhu Karn. He became a vassal ruler under the Mughals. He participated in an expedition against the Afghan ruler in Odisha. After Madhu Karn, his son Bairisal became king and he also participated in several expeditions with Akbar. When Akbar died, Bairisal withdrew tribute to the Mughals. Mughal launched expedition against Nagvanshi king but failed to subjugate them. Raja Durjan Shah, the son of Bairisal, was taken to prison in Agra for withdrawal of tribute to the Mughals; later he was released for identifying real diamonds. He built palaces, temples and ponds in Navratangarh. During this period, Baraik, Rautia and Rajput held Jagirs from Nagvanshi kings and provided military services. Land grants were made to Brahmins for their priestly services.

Ram Shah built Kapilnath Temple in 1643 CE in Navratangarh. Raghunath Shah (1663–1690) built several temples, including Madan Mohan temple in Boera and Jagannath temple. According to Lal Pradumn Singh, the writer of book Nagvansh, Mughal invaded Khukhra during reign of Raghunath Shah. Mughal officials were sent by Aurangzeb to attack Khukhra. The invasion was strongly resisted which resulted in the death of Mughal officials. Later he agreed to pay tax to the Mughals. Thakur Ani Nath Shahdeo made Satranji the capital of Barkagarh estate near Subarnarekha river. He built the Jagannath temple in 1691.

In 1719, during the reign of Emperor Muhammad Shah, Sarbuland Khan invaded to Chotanagpur plateau. Raja Yadunath Shah agreed to pay Rs. 100,000 (one lakh) as Nazrana. Then Yadunath Shah shifted the capital from Navratangarh to Palkot upon realising the weakness of the capital from a defensibility point of view. He was succeeded by his eldest son, Shivnath Shah (1724–1733). Due to non-payment of tribute, Fakhr-ud-daula invaded Khokhra in 1731. He faced considerable resistance from the Raja of Khokhra but both parties reached a compromise and he paid Rs. 12,000 as tribute. When Fakhr-ud-daula was removed from the post of Subedar of Bihar Suba in 1733, the Khokhra chief discontinued payment of tribute to Mughals. Maninath Shah (1748-1762) consolidated his authority over the estates of 
Bundu, Silli, Barwe, Rahe, and Tamar, and the chiefs of these estates were compelled to 
acknowledge the Nagvanshi ruler as their chief. 

After the Battle of Buxar in 1764, the East India Company were given the right to collect revenue from Bihar, Bengal and Odisha by the Mughal Empire. In 1771, during the reign of Dripnath Shah, Nagvanshi became a vassal of the East India Company due to conflicts with neighbouring kings and tribes.

Between 1795 to 1800, the Maratha Empire invaded Chotanagpur and looted and collected revenue forcefully. The British defeated the Maratha force in 1772. The British stationed military forces at Chotanagpur to check the incursions of Marathas. During the reign of Govind Nath Shah, due to the rebellion, refusal of payment of revenue by subordinate Jagirdar and Zamindar under Nagvanshi king due to excessive tax imposition by the East India Company, Chotanagpur was brought under direct control by the East India Company in 1817 and they reduced Nagvanshi rulers to Zamindars. The disposition of some Mankis in Sonepur Pargana and mistreatment with a Manki by contractors resulted in the Kol uprising in 1831 to 1833, when Munda plundered and burned properties of Sikh and Muslim contractors' houses. Then these activities spread to Ranchi district and tribal Munda, Hos and Oraon indulged in indiscriminate plunder and killings of Muslims and Sikhs as well as villages of Hindus. They destroyed Mahamaya temple built by Gajghat Rai in Hapamuni village of Gumla. These activities speard to Palamu and joined by Kharwar and Chero. This insurgency was suppressed by Thomas Wilkinson.

In 1855, during the reign of Jagannath Shah Deo, the king of Barkagarh estate, Vishwanath Shahdeo, stopped following the orders of the East India Company, defeated British forces in Hatia and ruled independently for two years. During the Rebellion of 1857, he led the rebels of Ramgarh Battalion. He organised an army with the assistance of nearby zamindars including Pandey Ganpat Rai, Tikait Umrao Singh, Sheikh Bhikhari, Jaimangal Singh, and Nadir Ali Khan. He fought against an East India Company force in the Battle of Chatra but was defeated. Jagatpal Singh, King of Pithoria, helped the British to defeat the rebels. Thakur Vishwanath Shahdeo was captured and hanged in Ranchi along with other rebels in April 1858. Later Barkagarh estate was confiscated for rebellion against Company rule.

The Nagvanshi rulers shifted their capital from Palkot to Ratu in 1870. Udai Pratap Nath Shah Deo built Ratu Palace in 1900. The last ruler of Nagvanshi dynasty was Lal Chintamani Sharan Nath Shahdeo (1931–2014). Zamindari was abolished after the independence of India in 1952.

Branches
Following are the states and estates established by Nagvanshi princes:
Barkagarh estate of Satrangi (now in Ranchi)
Khairagarh State of Khairagarh-Chhuikhadan-Gandai district, Chhattisgarh
Kalahandi State of Kalahandi, Odisha
Nilgiri State of Nilagiri, Baleswar, Odisha
Jariagarh Estate of Khunti district

Post-independence 
In modern period, Nagvanshi are divided into two subgroups namely Rajdariya, the descendants of the royal family, and Lohardagiya, the inhabitants of Lohardaga district. They have only one gotra Kashyap. Nagvanshi practice exogamy and establish relationships with other royal families. Nagvanshi use Shahdeo as their surname. They speak Nagpuri language and Hindi with others. They are non-vegetarian and eat rice, wheat and pulses.

Rulers
Following is the list of Nagvanshi rulers according to "Nag Vanshavali" (1876) written by Beniram Mehta during reign of Jagannath Shah Deo and book "Nagvansh" (1951) written by Lal Pradumn Singh during reign of Lal Chintamani Sharan Nath Shahdeo. There is considerable disagreement among historians about chronology of various kings and its authenticity. 57th Nagvanshi king Dripnath Shah (c. 1762–1790 CE) submitted list of Nagvanshi kings to the Governor General of India in 1787.

Raja

Maharaja
Maharaja Govind Nath Shah (1806–1822)
Maharaja Jagannath Shah Deo (1822–1869)
Maharaja Udai Pratap Nath Shah Deo (1869/72–1950)
Maharaja Lal Chintamani Sharan Nath Shahdeo (1950–1952)

Notable people
Ani Nath Shahdeo, King of Barkagarh
Vishwanath Shahdeo – Freedom fighter in 1857 rebellion
Lal Pingley Nath Shahdeo – Jurist and political activist
Lal Ranvijay Nath Shahdeo – Lawyer, writer and political activist
Lal Vijay Shahdeo – Film and television director
Gopal Sharan Nath Shahdeo – Prince and politician

See also
Chota Nagpur Division
Chota Nagpur Tributary States

References

Dynasties of India
Nagpuria people
History of Jharkhand
History of Bihar